Maršálek is Czech for "marshal". It may refer to:

People
Hans Maršálek (1914–2011), Austrian political activist and concentration camp survivor
Jan Marsalek (born 1980), Austrian businessman

Works
Imperial and Royal Field Marshal (Czech: C. a k. polní maršálek), 1930 Czechoslovak film